The 1970 Hardie-Ferodo 500 was the 11th running of the Bathurst 500 touring car race. It was held on 4 October 1970 at the Mount Panorama Circuit just outside Bathurst. The race was open to standard production sedans competing in five classes based on the purchase price of the vehicle (in Australian dollars).

Allan Moffat won his first Bathurst endurance race, leading home Bruce McPhee in a one-two result for the Ford works team and their Ford XW Falcon GTHO Phase II's. It was the fifth Phillip Island / Bathurst 500 victory for the factory team. Third, a lap behind the Fords, was Don Holland driving a Holden LC Torana GTR XU-1.

Defending winners Colin Bond and Tony Roberts drove separate cars in the event. Bond finished 16th in his Holden Dealer Team Torana GTR XU-1 after having led the early laps, while Roberts was lucky to survive a spectacular accident when his Ford Falcon GTHO crashed at Skyline only 6 laps from the finish. The Falcon spun backwards, leapt over the guard rail and rolled about 50 metres down the mountain before being stopped by a tree.

Class structure

Class A
For cars up to $1,960. It was made up of Datsun 1200s, 1.3 litre Ford Escorts, Mazda 1300s and Toyota Corollas. A Datsun 1200 won the class with an average lap time of 3 minutes, 26 seconds.

Class B
The $1,961 to $2,400 class consisted of Datsun 1600, Fiat 128, Ford Cortina and 2.6 litre Holden Torana.

Class C
The $2,401 to $3,150 class saw a mix of two barrel carburettor Chrysler Valiant Pacer, 1.6 litre Ford Escort, 3.1 litre Holden Torana and Morris Cooper S.

Class D
The $3,151 to $4,100 class featured only the four barrel carburettor Chrysler Valiant Pacer, a Fiat 125 and a Triumph 2.5 PI although a Ford Capri was also entered but did not start.

Class E
For cars over $4,100. Apart from a single BMW 2800 and a Holden Monaro the class consisted only of Ford Falcon GTHO Phase II.

Top 10 Qualifiers

Results

Statistics
 Pole Position - #64 Allan Moffat - 2:49.3
 Fastest Lap - #53 Goss/Skelton - 2:53 (lap record)
 Race time of winning car - 6:33:47

References

External links
 1970 Hardie-Ferodo 500, www.uniquecarsandparts.com.au (includes Official Programme and race results)
 Bathurst 1970 images, autopics.com.au

Motorsport in Bathurst, New South Wales
Hardie-Ferodo 500
October 1970 sports events in Australia